Rainbow is a collaborative album between Japanese rock band Boris and guitarist Michio Kurihara. Wata contributed vocals to the title song, which has a music video made for it by Foodunited.

The album's initial release was done by Pedal Records, with liner notes in Portuguese. Drag City released this album in the United States on May 15, 2007 with a different 9th track, on CD format only.

In 2007, the album was also released on vinyl in two forms by Inoxia Records: an unlimited LP which contains the album (same as Pedal CD version), and a double LP box set with a 50-page photo book in a special cover, the album on clear vinyl, a second LP containing two bonus ambient tracks (also on clear vinyl), and a DVD featuring the music video for "Rainbow".

The title track on the 2xLP version features an alternate mix with a different guitar solo, and re-recorded studio takes were used on Boris / Variations + Live in Japan and Gensho. Additionally, live versions of the song are found on Rock Dream, Smile -Live at Wolf Creek-, the Live in Japan DVD included with Variations, and the bonus live album on the deluxe CD pressing of Gensho.

Track listing

Pedal release

Drag City release

Inoxia 2-LP release

Personnel
 Michio Kurihara - guitars
 Takeshi - bass, vocals (tracks 1, 3, 5, 6, 8)
 Wata - keyboards, glockenspiel, vocals (track 2)
 Atsuo - drums, percussion

Releases history

References

External links
 

2006 albums
Boris (band) albums
Drag City (record label) albums
Collaborative albums